Edward Aston may refer to:
 Sir Edward Aston (died 1568),  Sheriff of Staffordshire in 1528, 1534, 1540, and 1556 
 Sir Edward Aston (died 1598), Sheriff of Staffordshire in 1590